Rhagio is a worldwide genus of predatory snipe flies. Several species in this genus are referred to as downlooker or down-looker flies because they sometimes perch on tree trunks in a head-down position. There are approximately 170 species. They can be distinguished from other rhagionids by the open anal cell on the wings and the lack of a kidney-shaped arista.

Furia ithacensis is a species of the pathogenic fungus in America that causes a fatal disease in flies, specifically snipe flies.

Species

Rhagio acutatus Yang, Dong & Zhang, 2016
Rhagio albibarbis (Bigot, 1887)
Rhagio albicornis (Say, 1823)
Rhagio albipilosus Becker, 1921
Rhagio albus Yang, Yang & Nagatomi, 1997
Rhagio algericus (Becker, 1906)
Rhagio alumnus Walker, 1852
Rhagio amurensis Makarkin, 1992
Rhagio annulatus (De Geer, 1776)
Rhagio apiciflavus Yang & Yang, 1991
Rhagio apiciniger Yang, Zhu & Gao, 2005
Rhagio apicipennis (Brunetti, 1909)
Rhagio arcuatus (Meijere, 1911)
Rhagio asticta Yang & Yang, 1994
Rhagio aterrimus Zeegers & Álvarez, 2016
Rhagio balcanicus (Strobl, 1902)
Rhagio basalis (Philippi, 1865)
Rhagio basiflavus Yang & Yang, 1993
Rhagio basimaculatus Yang & Yang, 1993
Rhagio basiniger Yang, Dong & Zhang, 2016
Rhagio bawanglinganus Yang, Dong & Zhang, 2016
Rhagio beckeri Lindner, 1923
Rhagio bifurcatus (Meunier, 1902)
Rhagio biroi Szilády, 1934
Rhagio bisectus Yang, Yang & Nagatomi, 1997
Rhagio bitaeniatus (Bellardi, 1862)
Rhagio brunneipennis Leonard, 1930
Rhagio calcaratus Statz, 1940
Rhagio californicus Leonard, 1930
Rhagio capnopterus (Wiedemann, 1828)
Rhagio cavannae (Bezzi, 1898)
Rhagio centrimaculatus Yang & Yang, 1993
Rhagio chillcotti James, 1965
Rhagio chonganus Yang, Dong & Zhang, 2016
Rhagio chongqinensis Yang, Dong & Zhang, 2016
Rhagio choui Yang & Yang, 1997
Rhagio chrysopilaeformis (Bezzi, 1898)
Rhagio chrysostigma (Loew, 1857)
Rhagio cinerascens (Röder, 1884)
Rhagio cinereus (Zetterstedt, 1842)
Rhagio cingulatus (Loew, 1856)
Rhagio conspicuus Meigen, 1804
Rhagio corsicanus Becker, 1910
Rhagio costalis Matsumura, 1911
Rhagio costatus (Loew, 1862)
Rhagio costimaculata Matsumura, 1916
Rhagio crassitibia Yang, Dong & Zhang, 2016
Rhagio dashahensis Yang, Dong & Zhang, 2016
Rhagio dichromaticus Chillcott, 1965
Rhagio difficilis Becker, 1921
Rhagio dimidiatus (Loew, 1863)
Rhagio discoidalis (Brunetti, 1912)
Rhagio dulonjianganus Yang, Dong & Zhang, 2016
Rhagio elenae Soboleva, 1991
Rhagio expansus ssp. expansus James, 1964
Rhagio expansus ssp. franciscanus James, 1964
Rhagio expassus (Meunier, 1910)
Rhagio exporrectus (Meunier, 1910)
Rhagio expositus (Meunier, 1910)
Rhagio exsanguis Meunier, 1910
Rhagio fanjingshanus Yang, Dong & Zhang, 2016
Rhagio fascinatoris (Meunier, 1910)
Rhagio ferruginosus ssp. griseicollis Frey, 1954
Rhagio ferus (Meunier, 1910)
Rhagio flavicornis (Macquart, 1826)
Rhagio flavimarginatus Yang, Dong & Zhang, 2016
Rhagio flavimedius (Coquillett, 1898)
Rhagio floralis Panzer, 1804
Rhagio floreus Panzer, 1804
Rhagio floridensis Chillcott, 1965
Rhagio formosus Bezzi, 1912
Rhagio fossitius Melander, 1949
Rhagio freyae Lindner, 1923
Rhagio fusca (Wiedemann, 1828)
Rhagio fuscipennis (Meigen, 1820)
Rhagio gansuensis Yang & Yang, 1997
Rhagio gracilis (Johnson, 1912)
Rhagio graeculus (Loew, 1869)
Rhagio grandis Szilády, 1934
Rhagio guadarramensis Strobl, 1909
Rhagio guangxiensis Yang & Yang, 1993
Rhagio guizhouensis Yang & Yang, 1992
Rhagio hainanensis Yang & Yang, 1997
Rhagio hangzhouensis Yang & Yang, 1989
Rhagio henanensis Yang, Zhu & Gao, 2002
Rhagio houae Yang, Dong & Zhang, 2016
Rhagio huangi Yang, Dong & Zhang, 2016
Rhagio huashanensis Yang & Yang, 1997
Rhagio hyaloptera (Wiedemann, 1828)
Rhagio idaeus Bezzi, 1908
Rhagio immaculatus (Meigen, 1804)
Rhagio incisus (Loew, 1872)
Rhagio insularis Becker, 1921
Rhagio inurbana (Aldrich, 1915)
Rhagio inutilis Walker, 1848
Rhagio iriomotensis Nagatomi & Nagatomi, 1990
Rhagio itoi Nagatomi, 1952
Rhagio japonicus Matsumura, 1916
Rhagio javanus Lindner, 1925
Rhagio jinxiuensis Yang & Yang, 1993
Rhagio karafutonis Matsumura, 1916
Rhagio korinchiensis Edwards, 1919
Rhagio latifrons Yang, Dong & Zhang, 2016
Rhagio latipennis (Loew, 1856)
Rhagio libanonicus Szilády, 1934
Rhagio lineola Fabricius, 1794
Rhagio lineola ssp. andalusiaca (Strobl, 1909
Rhagio longshengensis Yang & Yang, 1993
Rhagio longzhouensis Yang & Yang, 1993
Rhagio lugens (Philippi, 1865)
Rhagio luteus Soboleva, 1984
Rhagio lutifaciatus Okada, 1941
Rhagio maculatus (De Geer, 1776)
Rhagio maculifer (Bigot, 1887)
Rhagio maculifer ssp. byersi James, 1964
Rhagio maculifer ssp. styx James, 1964
Rhagio maculipennis (Loew, 1854)
Rhagio maolanus Yang & Yang, 1993
Rhagio matsumurae Lindner, 1923
Rhagio medeae Iacob, 1971
Rhagio meridionalis Yang & Yang, 1993
Rhagio miyonis Nagatomi, 1952
Rhagio mongolicus Lindner, 1923
Rhagio montanus Becker, 1921
Rhagio montivagus Edwards, 1919
Rhagio morulus Nagatomi, 1971
Rhagio mystaceus (Macquart, 1840)
Rhagio naganensis Nagatomi, 1952
Rhagio nagatomii Yang & Yang, 1997
Rhagio napoensis Yang, Dong & Zhang, 2016
Rhagio neimengensis Yang, Dong & Zhang, 2016
Rhagio nigra (Meigen & Wiedemann, 1820)
Rhagio nigrata (Philippi, 1865)
Rhagio nigrifemur Yang, Dong & Zhang, 2016
Rhagio nigritibia Yang, Dong & Zhang, 2016
Rhagio ningminganus Yang & Yang, 1993
Rhagio notatus (Meigen, 1820)
Rhagio ochraceus (Loew, 1862)
Rhagio olgae Soboleva, 1991
Rhagio olsufjevi Soboleva, 1989
Rhagio orestes Chillcott, 1965
Rhagio pallidipennis Becker, 1921
Rhagio pallidistigma (Meijere, 1924)
Rhagio pallipilosus Yang, Zhu & Gao, 2005
Rhagio palpalis (Adams, 1904)
Rhagio perdicaceus Frey, 1954
Rhagio petrovae Soboleva, 1989
Rhagio philippinensis Frey, 1954
Rhagio pilosus Yang, Yang & Nagatomi, 1997
Rhagio plumbeus Say, 1823
Rhagio poecilopterus Bezzi, 1908
Rhagio politaeniatus (Bellardi, 1862)
Rhagio pollinosus Leonard, 1930
Rhagio pseudasticta Yang & Yang, 1994
Rhagio puellaris Nagatomi, 1971
Rhagio pullatus (Coquillett, 1898)
Rhagio punctipennis (Say, 1823)
Rhagio rolandi Becker, 1921
Rhagio rondanii Bezzi, 1908
Rhagio sabahensis Nagatomi & Nagatomi, 1990
Rhagio samlandicus (Meunier, 1916)
Rhagio sardous Szilády, 1934
Rhagio scapulifer (Bigot, 1887)
Rhagio schmidti Lindner, 1931
Rhagio scolopacea (Linnaeus, 1758)
Rhagio separatus Yang, Yang & Nagatomi, 1997
Rhagio shaanxiensis Yang & Yang, 1997
Rhagio sheni Yang, Zhu & Gao, 2003
Rhagio shennonganus Yang & Yang, 1991
Rhagio shimai Nagatomi & Nagatomi, 1990
Rhagio shiraki Szilády, 1934
Rhagio sikisimanus Nagatomi, 1972
Rhagio simushirus Soboleva, 1989
Rhagio singularis Yang, Yang & Nagatomi, 1997
Rhagio sinuatus Edwards, 1919
Rhagio songae Yang, Dong & Zhang, 2016
Rhagio sordidus (Loew, 1862)
Rhagio stigmosus Yang, Yang & Nagatomi, 1997
Rhagio strigosus Meigen, 1804
Rhagio subannulata (Philippi, 1865)
Rhagio subpilosus (Becker, 1892)
Rhagio taorminae Becker, 1921
Rhagio terminalis (Loew, 1861)
Rhagio tipuliformis Fabricius, 1794
Rhagio tonsa (Loew, 1869)
Rhagio triangulata (Brunetti, 1920)
Rhagio tringaria (Linnaeus, 1758)
Rhagio tringarius ssp. goebelii (Strobl, 1893
Rhagio tuberculatus Yang, Yang & Nagatomi, 1997
Rhagio turcicus Lindner, 1931
Rhagio unicolor (Brunetti, 1912)
Rhagio uniguttatus (Osten Sacken, 1881)
Rhagio validus (Meunier, 1899)
Rhagio venetianus Becker, 1921
Rhagio vermileonoides Frey, 1954
Rhagio vertebratus (Say, 1823)
Rhagio wenxianus Yang, Zhu & Gao, 2005
Rhagio wheeleri Melander, 1949
Rhagio wuyishanus Yang, Dong & Zhang, 2016
Rhagio xanthodes Yang, Dong & Zhang, 2016
Rhagio yasumatsui Nagatomi, 1972
Rhagio zhaoae Yang, Dong & Zhang, 2016
Rhagio zhejiangensis Yang & Yang, 1989
Rhagio zhuae Yang, Dong & Zhang, 2016

Gallery

References

External links

 Key to European Rhagio

Rhagionidae
Diptera of Africa
Diptera of Asia
Diptera of North America
Diptera of Australasia
Diptera of South America
Diptera of Europe
Brachycera genera
Taxa named by Johan Christian Fabricius